The EPK machine gun was designed by EPK, a Greek defense company (in English, "Greek Powder and Cartridge Company", GPCC) later known as Pyrkal.

Description
The gun's creation is connected to EPK's ambitions to become a major producer of infantry weapons. Following a proposal to the Greek government in 1937 the development of a modern machine gun of EPK's own design began, as well as construction of a small number of prototypes in 1939. The whole project, including the building of infrastructure for massive production of the gun, was underway when war with Italy broke out on October 28, 1940, subsequent events prohibited its completion. A total of no more than (probably) 10-15 were built, their fate (except for one given as a present to a member of the Greek Royal Family) remains unknown. Later publications suggested that this 7.92 mm weapon exhibited characteristics at the time closer to those of a submachine gun; others, though, including Pyrkal itself, have argued that the weapon was a very advanced design for its time, featuring pioneering elements of a whole class of future assault rifle. Its construction was close to the Thompson submachine gun with ergonomics and weight  compatible with the present day Ultimax 100 light machine gun.

See also
Ribeyrolles 1918 automatic carbine
Weibel M/1932

References

Christos Sazanidis, "Ta opla ton Ellinon (Arms of the Greeks)", Maiandros, Thessaloniki (1995)
W. Smith - J. Smith, "Small Arms of the World", 10th rev.ed., Stackpole, Harrisburg (1973)

External links 
 Pyrkal

Light machine guns
World War II infantry weapons of Greece
World War II machine guns
8 mm machine guns
Weapons and ammunition introduced in 1939
Rifles of Greece